Turbo-folk (sometimes referred as pop-folk or popular folk) is subgenre of contemporary pop music with its origins in Serbia, that initially developed during the 1980s and 1990s, with similar music styles in Bulgaria (chalga), Romania (manele) and Albania (tallava). It is a fusion genre of popular music, blending Serbian folk music with other genres: such as pop, rock, electronic and some hip-hop.

Background and characteristics
Turbo-folk music emerged as a subculture in the countryside during the 1970s before migrating to the city in the '80s and eventually reaching further expansion in the '90s during the rule of Slobodan Milošević, Yugoslav Wars, inflation and political isolation.

The term was originally coined by Montenegrin musician Rambo Amadeus whilst jokingly referring to his own musical style. However, critics soon adopted this term which referred to a musical style blending folk music with elements of electronic music, Eurodance and hip-hop or other genres not related to true Serbian traditional music. Turkish and Greek folk music have also had great influence, often with cases of plagiarism without consequences due to the political situation in Yugoslavia. Songs were primarily composed by acclaimed rock and pop musicians such as Milić Vukašinović, Goran Bregović and Kornelije Kovač with lyrics mainly written by Marina Tucaković. Most of the tracks involve themes of love, mainly adultery and sex, then materialism, alcohol and vice.

The visual image also went through changes and was heading towards MTV aesthetics. Music videos and editorials were mostly directed by former art photographer Dejan Milićević, who himself stated Baroque as his main inspiration. Turbo-folk was predominantly broadcast on RTV Palma and RTV Pink.

Performers and popularity
The record in sales is held by Lepa Brena, who has sold over 40 million records and held some of the biggest concerts on the Balkans, making her the most successful Bosnian singer to date. Brena was also considered to be the symbol of former Yugoslavia, the country's unity and power, and after the breakup of the federation, of so-called yugo-nostalgia. At the time, the only "rival" Lepa Brena had was Vesna Zmijanac. Zmijanac and Brena were considered the biggest stars in Yugoslavia. Recognized as one of the most popular Yugoslavian singers, Zmijanac was dubbed the sex symbol, fashionista and gay icon of the eighties. 

Among various turbo-folk singers in the nineties, arguably the biggest star of the decade was Dragana Mirković, who has sold more than 10 million records. She was at the time signed to Južni Vetar, alongside other popular singers like Mile Kitić, Sinan Sakić and Šemsa Suljaković. Arguably one of the most famous Ex-Yugoslavian artists, Zorica Brunclik is known for her singing voice, fashion style and bright pink hair. Sometimes she and folk singer Snežana Đurišić are labeled as the queens of new folk music.

However, Svetlana Ceca Ražnatović and Aca Lukas dominated in the late nineties and early two thousands acquiring enormous popularity despite their controversies. Ceca was married to Željko Ražnatović Arkan, commander of the Serb Volunteer Guard, while Lukas is known for his troublesome lifestyle involving drug addictions and gambling problems. Both singers were arrested during the operation Sablja in 2003. Nevertheless, today they are both considered as the biggest stars on the Balkans. Because of her popularity, Ceca is referred to as the "Serbian mother". She also holds the record for the biggest concert made by a Serbian singer. Her concert Ušće 2013 was attended by more than 150 000 people. Jelena Karleuša also rose to prominence in the mid nineties, recognized for her highly sexual image and provocative work. During this period, Croatia also had their own pop-folk stars like Severina and Magazin with its lead singer Jelena Rozga.

In the 2000s, the single-person dominated scene was replaced by diverse performers who remained popular for at least a year. New music and its performers were labeled as pop-folk performers. Serbian record label Grand Production signed almost every singer in the country, taking monopoly over the music industry with significant media space for its TV shows, music festivals and magazines. Grand was held responsible for the success of the most of, at the time, popular acts like Seka Aleksić, Indira Radić, Saša Matić, Goga Sekulić, Stoja, Dara Bubamara, Aco Pejović, Viki Miljković, Sanja Đorđević, Jana, Dejan Matić and many more. At the beginning of the 2000s popular singers Viki Miljković and Indira Radić became one of the biggest stars in the country. In 2006 Indira Radić received the award for the largest number of concerts held. In 2005 with her album Mahi, mahi Viki Miljković became one of the most successful and popular singers at the time. Every single song on her album became an enormous hit throughout the Balkans.  Popular reality singing competition Zvezde Granda also created many raising stars of pop-folk, such as Milica Todorović, Tanja Savić, Milan Stanković, Rada Manojlović and Milica Pavlović, whose careers were managed by Grand. The stars that emerged in later seasons were Aleksandra Prijović, Katarina Grujić and Andreana Čekić.

Pop-folk is a music genre dominated by Ana Bekuta and Neda Ukraden. Both of them are hugely popular with their careers lasting for decades. Ana Bekuta is a big star in Serbia, while Neda Ukraden is more successful on the Balkan music scene.

In the 2010s, pop-folk embraced even more pop influence and would often infuse electronic or hip-hop, leaning toward club music. Previously an underground hip-hop duo, Elitni Odredi gained enormous popularity after they had commercialized their sound by adding folk music. They were the pioneers of digital age in Serbian music, avoiding mainstream media, while using YouTube as their main platform. Bosnian singer Maya Berović, who saw moderate success in the 2000s, reached the zenith of her career when she collaborated with rappers Jala Brat and Buba Corelli on her 2017 album Viktorijina tajna, which was a mixture of contemporary R&B and pop-folk.

Criticism
 
Although very popular, turbo-folk is described as pseudo-folklore, while often linking it to Serbian involvement in Bosnian and Croatian conflicts during the nineties. This left-wing section of Serbian and Croatian society explicitly viewed this music as vulgar, almost pornographic kitsch, glorifying crime, moral corruption and nationalist xenophobia. In addition to making a connection between turbofolk and "war profiteering, crime & weapons cult, rule of force and violence", in her book Smrtonosni sjaj (Deadly Splendor) Belgrade media theorist Ivana Kronja refers to its look as "aggressive, sadistic and pornographically eroticised iconography". Along the same lines, British culture theorist Alexei Monroe calls the phenomenon "porno-nationalism". However, turbo-folk was equally popular amongst the South Slavic nations during the brutal wars of the 1990s, reflecting perhaps the common cultural sentiments of the warring sides.

The resilience of a turbo-folk culture and musical genre, often referred to as the "soundtrack to Serbia’s wars", was and to a certain extent still is, actively promoted and exploited by pro-government commercial TV stations, most notably on Pink and Palma TV-channels, which devote significant amount of their broadcasting schedule to turbo-folk shows and music videos.

Others, however, feel that this neglects the specific social and political context that brought about turbo-folk, which was, they say, entirely different from the context of contemporary western popular culture. In their opinion, turbo-folk served as a dominant paradigm of the "militant nationalist" regime of Slobodan Milošević, "fully controlled by regime media managers". John Fiske feels that during that period, turbo-folk and its close counterpart Serbian eurodance had the monopoly over the officially permitted popular culture, while, according to him, in contrast, Western mass media culture of the time provided a variety of music genre, youth styles, and consequently ideological positions.

Upon introduction of Billboard Croatia Songs chart on 15 February 2022, it became apparent that mainstream music from Serbia and other former Yugoslav republics (which is all classified as turbo-folk or more commonly "" by its critics in Croatia) dominated the music taste of the people of Croatia, as the only Croatian artists featured on the chart were Eni Jurišić, Matija Cvek, 30zona, Kuku$ Klan, Jelena Rozga and Grše, and the only Western artists featured on the chart were Glass Animals and Red Hot Chili Peppers.

See also

Music of Serbia
Balkan ballad
Chalga
Manele
Arabesk music
Disco polo
Laïkó
Dangdut
Eurodance

Notes

References

 Sabina Mihelj, "The Media and the Symbolic Geographies of Europe: The Case of Yugoslavia", 2007.
 William Uricchio, We Europeans?: media, representations, identities, Intellect Books, 2008, p. 168-9

External links
 Balkania Fanzine - Turbo-Folk and Balkan Music Video Culture Blog
 Report about turbo-folk, ceca and politics
 Muzika u vestima dana

 
Serbian styles of music
Serbian music
Pop music genres
Balkan music
Folk music genres